Simon Kasprowicz is a former Australian professional rugby union player who has played for the New South Wales Waratahs and Mitsubishi Sagamihara DynaBoars in Japan. He primarily played at flanker.

Early life
Kasprowicz attended Brisbane State High School.

Career in Australia
Kasprowicz played 21 matches for the New South Wales Waratahs from 2002 to 2004, scoring two tries.

Career in Japan
Kasprowicz played in Japan between 2005 and 2008 for the Mitsubishi Sagamihara DynaBoars.

Post playing
Kasprowicz now works as a director for portfolio sales for CBRE Group in Sydney.

Personal life
Kasprowicz is the younger brother of former Australian cricketer Michael Kasprowicz. Their father is from Poland.

References

Living people
Australian rugby union players
Australian people of Polish descent
Rugby union players from Brisbane
New South Wales Waratahs players
Rugby union flankers
Mitsubishi Sagamihara DynaBoars players
Australian expatriate rugby union players
Australian expatriate sportspeople in Japan
Expatriate rugby union players in Japan
People educated at Brisbane State High School
Year of birth missing (living people)